Dead Man's Shoes is a 2004 British psychological thriller film directed by Shane Meadows and starring Paddy Considine, both of whom co-wrote the film with Paul Fraser. The film also stars Toby Kebbell, Gary Stretch and Stuart Wolfenden. It was released in the United Kingdom on 1 October 2004 and in the United States on 12 May 2006. Filming took place in the summer of 2003 over the course of three weeks.

Plot

Richard returns to his home town of Matlock, Derbyshire, in the Peak District, England, after serving in the British Army. He and his younger, mentally impaired brother, Anthony, camp at an abandoned farm near the town. Flashbacks reveal Anthony's abuse by a group of drug dealers in the town; Richard vows to take revenge.

Richard meets Herbie, one of the abusers, who does not recognise him at first. Later, Herbie and friends Soz and Tuff are in a flat taking drugs. He tells them about the confrontation, and says he thinks the man might be Anthony's brother. When Herbie leaves he finds a man in a military gas mask outside the front door. Soz and Tuff run outside but the man is nowhere to be seen. When they go back into their flat, they discover that Richard has ransacked it and stolen the drugs.

The next day, Herbie, Soz and Tuff call on Sonny, the leader of the gang. When he answers the door, he has had his face painted but does not realise. Fellow gang members Big Al and Gypsy John have also had their hair and clothes painted during the night. They all suspect one another of playing games until Herbie tells them that Richard is back in town.

The men encounter Richard while driving in their Citroën 2CV. He tells Sonny he is not scared of any of them, and invites them to come to the farm where he is staying. That evening, while the gang are playing cards, Sonny decides that they should shoot Richard. When Gypsy John goes to the toilet, Richard (having sneaked into the house) kills him with an axe, using the dead man's blood to smear the words "One Down" on the wall.

The next morning, the gang go to the farm where Richard is staying with Anthony. Sending in Big Al to draw Richard out, Sonny prepares to shoot him with a rifle and their only round. However, he misses and kills Al. With no rounds remaining in the rifle, they retreat back to town as Richard smiles.

The surviving members stop at a local petrol station where the car breaks down and Tuff runs off, fearing Richard's revenge. Later at Sonny's house, they arm themselves. Richard is hiding in the kitchen pantry, and laces their kettle with the stolen drugs. Once the three men are completely intoxicated, Richard reappears to kill them one by one. He shoots Sonny in the head, and kills Soz with an upward palm strike. He then shows Herbie a suitcase which has Tuff's corpse inside. Richard then tells him he is a good man and will let him live if he tells him where to find the final gang member, who left the gang years before. Herbie tells him without hesitation, and Richard hugs him, before stabbing him with a knife that Herbie had intended to use on him.

The next day, Richard arrives in a nearby town where the final gang member, Mark, lives with his wife and two sons. He talks with the children's mother and asks her to let her husband know that he is Richard, Anthony's brother. When Mark returns home, she explains the conversation to her husband. Terrified, he tells her how the gang abused Anthony. The abuse culminated with them pretending to hang him at a local ruined castle whilst he was high on acid. Anthony then actually hanged himself after the gang ran off. It then becomes clear that Richard has been alone the whole time and talking to a vision of his dead brother.

The next morning, Richard takes Mark hostage. He takes him to where Anthony hanged himself and demands he tell him his part in what happened. Mark explains how his fault was in not stopping the abuse. Richard confesses to killing the other men, and tells Mark that he now feels like a monster. He gives the knife to Mark and demands that he kill him lest he continue his monstrous ways. Mark eventually stabs and kills Richard before stumbling away with blood on his hands.

Cast
 Paddy Considine as Richard
 Toby Kebbell as Anthony
 Gary Stretch as Sonny
 Stuart Wolfenden as Herbie
 Neil Bell as Soz
 Paul Sadot as Tuff
 Seamus O'Neil as Big Al
 George Newton as Gypsy John
 Paul Hurstfield as Mark
 Emily Aston as Patti
 Jo Hartley as Marie
 Craig Considine as Craig
 Matt Considine as Matt
 Andrew Shim as Elvis
 Kephas Leroc as K

Production
After completing Once Upon a Time in the Midlands, Shane Meadows had gone on a hiatus. Paddy Considine had made the short film My Wrongs, which was the first project of Warp Films. Considine introduced Meadows to Warp's Mark Herbert and showed him some of their earlier short films. Based on those, Herbert agreed to fund the making of a movie.

Meadows was keen to get back to his short film roots and cowrote the script with Considine and long-time collaborator Paul Fraser. Originally intended to be a black comedy about a heroic social worker based on a real-life event that Considine had come across, the story took a darker turn when Meadows remembered a friend with disabilities who had died when he was young. Taking inspiration from these real-life situations they had experienced and people they had encountered and the feel of exploitation films, Meadows and Considine turned in a story outline originally titled The Skull. There was no definitive script, with most of the scenes and lines existing as a rough draft. As a result, most of the dialogue and set pieces were improvised on set.

Toby Kebbell was cast at short notice after the actor who had originally been intended to play the character of Anthony dropped out due to concerns about playing the learning difficulties realistically. The character was rewritten from an older brother to a younger brother accordingly. Similarly, former boxer Gary Stretch was hired at the eleventh hour after expressing interest in making films in Britain. Dead Man's Shoes was the screen debut for both actors. It was also the first film that Jo Hartley featured in. Emily Aston had appeared on television but Dead Man's Shoes was also her first feature film role.

Because of the nature of low budget film making, numerous other changes from the script were made virtually on the fly. Neil Bell's character was scripted to be killed off first, but because of how well he worked on set, it was decided that another character would die and the scene was rewritten overnight. A violent confrontation between Richard and the gang was also changed to the scene in which Richard threatens Sonny.

Filming took place in and around the town of Matlock, Derbyshire in May 2003, with re-shoots and pick up shots taken in October the same year. The farm where Richard and Anthony stay is located in Bonsall. Darley Dale, Tansley and Riber feature heavily. The ending was shot at Riber Castle. The film took three weeks to shoot. Because of the low budget, the entire film crew and actors were transported in a single minibus.

The Citroën 2CV used in the film was inspired by an acquaintance of Shane Meadows who had a similar car. The 2CV still exists and was recently seen at a Citroën themed car show, albeit having been repainted. The 2CV also featured in the black comedy series Shameless.

Music
The film features music from, among others, Aphex Twin. Gavin Clark and Nick Hemming, both regular collaborators with Shane Meadows, contributed to the soundtrack. Several additional songs written by other artists on Warp Records appear on the film's soundtrack.

Soundtrack

The soundtrack album was released by Warp Records in October 2004.
 Smog – "Vessel in Vain"
 Calexico – "Untitled II"
 Calexico – "Untitled III"
 Adem – "Statued"
 Calexico – "Ritual Road Map"
 Laurent Garnier – "Forgotten Thoughts"
 The Earlies – "Morning Wonder"
 Richard Hawley – "Steel 2"
 Clayhill – "Afterlight"
 Calexico – "Crooked Road and the Briar"
 Lucky Dragons – "Heartbreaker"
 Gravenhurst – "The Diver"
 Cul de Sac – "I Remember Nothing More"
 P.G. Six – "The Fallen Leaves That Jewel the Ground"
 Amor Belhom Duo B C – "Pluie Sans Nuages"
 Aphex Twin – "Nanou 2"
 M. Ward – "Dead Man"
 DM & Jemini – "The Only One"

Tracks that appeared in the film but not on the soundtrack album include "Monkey Hair Hide" by The Leisure Society, "A King at Night" by Bonnie "Prince" Billy, "De Profundis" by Arvo Pärt, "Let My Prayer Arise" by Dmitry Bortniansky, sung by the Estonian Philharmonic Chamber Choir, "Chinese Water Python" by Robyn Hitchcock, "Sunny Days" by Position Normal and "The Only One" Featuring. Jemini by Danger Mouse.

Graphic novel 
A limited-edition graphic novel adapted and illustrated by Anjan Sarkar and based on the script was published to tie in with the release of the film. The book was Warp's first publishing effort. Sarkar had worked on the storyboards for the movie, as well as those for My Wrongs and used his work as the basis for the adaptation, which expanded certain scenes and ideas than those seen in the movie. The book was reissued for Warp Films' tenth anniversary.

Reception 
Writing in The Observer, Philip French called the film "A very skilful, superbly edited piece of moviemaking". The Daily Telegraph wrote that the film was "not for the faint hearted". Upon release in the United States, The New York Times stated that the film '"had style and the story is told with authority“ but otherwise felt it was run of the mill. When released in Australia in October 2006, it was described as "very moralistic" and "thrilling." The film was ranked number 180 in Empire magazine's "201 Greatest Movies of All Time" feature in the March 2006 issue. It also made other appearances in the magazine's 2008 list of the 500 greatest movies of all time, where it was ranked at number 462, and in October 2011, where it came 27th in the "100 Best British Films Ever." In celebration of their 200th issue in October 2012, Total Film named it the twelfth best film of the magazine's lifetime. It was ranked number 92 in Time Outs list of the 100 best British films.

Paddy Considine won Best British Actor at the 2005 Empire Awards, beating, among others, Simon Pegg for Shaun of the Dead and Daniel Craig for Layer Cake. Dead Man's Shoes was nominated for eight British Independent Film Awards. Toby Kebbell was nominated for Best Newcomer while Gary Stretch was nominated for a Best Supporting Actor award at the same ceremony.

On Rotten Tomatoes, the film has an approval rating of 58% based on 48 reviews with an average rating of 6.1/10. The site's critical consensus reads, "Though enhanced by cramped, gritty camerawork, this unsettling look at violence and revenge lacks the provocative edge needed to give it a substantial kick." On Metacritic, the film has a score of 52 out of 100 based on 14 critics, indicating "mixed or average reviews".

Live re-score
On 17 November 2012, as part of Warp Films 10-year anniversary celebrations (WarpFilms10), Dead Man's Shoes was re-scored live at the Magna Science and Adventure Centre in Rotherham by musicians Gavin Clark, Joel Cadbury, Jah Wobble and more. Its popularity led to a follow-up event in London as part of the Warp Films season at BFI Southbank on 29 March 2013 at the Southbank Centre's BFI Sonic Cinema. Featuring Gavin Clark (Clayhill, UNKLE), Joel Cadbury (UNKLE, South), Ali Friend (Clayhill), Ted Barnes (Clayhill), Jeff Wootton, Daisy Palmer (Goldfrapp) and Helen Boulding. All performances feature a special introduction from Paddy Considine.

References

External links
 
 
 

2004 films
2004 crime thriller films
2004 independent films
2004 psychological thriller films
2000s gang films
British films about revenge
British crime thriller films
British gangster films
British independent films
British psychological thriller films
Films about brothers
Films about death
Films about grieving
Films about murderers
Films about suicide
Films directed by Shane Meadows
Films set in 1993
Films set in 2004
Films set in Derbyshire
Film4 Productions films
Murder–suicide in films
2000s English-language films
2000s British films